Victoria Azarenka was the defending champion, but chose not to participate.

Angelique Kerber won the title, defeating Ana Ivanovic in the final, 6–4, 7–6(8–6).

Seeds
Angelique Kerber received a wildcard after the original draw was made.  The wildcard had originally been given to Lisa-Maria Moser, who was forced to withdraw from the tournament.
Kerber was given the top seed but placed in the bottom half of the draw, and several seeds were moved around in the draw to accommodate Kerber's late entry.

Draw

Finals

Top half

Bottom half

Qualifying

Seeds

Qualifiers

Lucky loser
  Maryna Zanevska

Qualifying draw

First qualifier

Second qualifier

Third qualifier

Fourth qualifier

References
 Main Draw
 Qualifying Draw

Generali Ladies Linz - Singles
Generali Ladies Linz Doubles